The Left Democratic Front (LDF) also known as Left Front (Kerala) is an alliance of left-wing political parties in the state of Kerala, India. It is the current ruling political alliance of Kerala, since 2016. It is one of the two major political alliances in Kerala, the other being Indian National Congress-led United Democratic Front, each of which has been in power alternately for the last four decades. LDF has won the elections to the State Legislature of Kerala in the years 1980, 1987, 1996, 2006, 2016 and had a historic re-election in 2021 where an incumbent government was re-elected for first time in 40 years. LDF has won 6 out of 10 elections since the formation of the alliance in 1980. The alliance consists of CPI(M), CPI, KC(M), NCP, JD(S) and various smaller parties.

LDF has been in power in the State Legislature of Kerala under E. K. Nayanar (1980–1981, 1987–1991, 1996–2001), V. S. Achuthanandan (2006–2011), Pinarayi Vijayan (2016–current). E. K. Nayanar served as the Chief Minister of Kerala for 11 years and later became the longest serving Chief Minister of Kerala.

The alliance led by Pinarayi Vijayan returned to power in 2016 Assembly Election winning 91 out of 140 seats and further increasing its tally to 99 seats in the 2021 Assembly Election. Pinarayi Vijayan became the first Chief minister of Kerala to be re-elected after completing a full term (five years) in office after a historic election in 2021 where an incumbent government was re-elected for the first time in 40 years.

Current members

History

Early years (1957 - 1979) 

The political scenario in Kerala (1957–1980) was characterized by continually shifting alliances, party mergers and splits, factionalism within the coalitions and within political parties, and the formation of a numerous splinter groups. 1957 Kerala Legislative Assembly election was the first assembly election in the Indian state of Kerala. The Communist Party of India won the election with 60 seats. The election led to the formation of first democratically elected communist government in India. A Communist-led government under E. M. S. Namboodiripad resulted from the first elections for the new Kerala Legislative Assembly in 1957, making him the first communist leader in India to head a popularly elected government. It was the second ever Communist government to be democratically elected, after Communist success in the 1945 elections in the Republic of San Marino, a microstate in Europe. The coalition politics of Kerala began with second election held to the state legislative assembly in 1960. The Communist Party of India (Marxist) first came into power in Kerala in 1967, under Seven party front, which was an alliance of CPI(M), CPI, IUML, and four other parties. In 1970's, the major political parties in the state were unified under two major coalitions, one of them led by Indian National Congress and Communist Party of India and the other by CPI(M).

Formation of LDF (1979)
In the late 1970s and early 1980s, two main pre-poll political alliances were formed: the Left Democratic Front (LDF), led by the Communist Party of India (Marxist) and Communist Party of India and the United Democratic Front (UDF), led by the Indian National Congress. These pre-poll political alliances of Kerala have stabilized strongly in such a manner that, with rare exceptions, most of the coalition partners stick their loyalty to the respective alliances (Left Democratic Front or United Democratic Front).

Left Democratic Front (1980 - Present)

LDF first came into power in 1980 election under the leadership of E. K. Nayanar sworn in as the Chief Minister of Kerala on 26 March 1980 for the first time in 1980. He formed government with the support of Congress (A) under A. K. Antony and Kerala Congress under K. M. Mani, Nayanar later became the longest serving Chief Minister of Kerala, ever since 1980 election, the power has been clearly alternating between the two alliances till the 2016. LDF has won 6 out of 10 elections since the formation of the alliance in 1980. Since 1980, none of alliances in Kerala has been re-elected till the 2016. The 1987, 1996 elections led E. K. Nayanar, and the 2006 elections led by V. S. Achuthanandan formed governments and completed their full terms but were not re-elected.  In 2016, LDF won the 2016 election led by Pinarayi Vijayan and had a historic re-election in 2021 election where an incumbent government was re-elected for first time in 40 years. Pinarayi Vijayan is the first Chief minister of Kerala to be re-elected after completing a full term (five years) in office.

List of LDF Conveners

Chief Ministers

Pre-Left Democratic Front Parties Chief Ministers (1956 – 1979) 

 E. M. S. Namboodiripad (1957 – 59), (1967 - 1969)
 C. Achutha Menon (1969 - 1977)
 P. K. Vasudevan Nair (1978 – 79)

List of political alliances of Kerala in power (1980 - present)

List of Chief Ministers by length of term (1980 - present)

Electoral history

Electoral history

List of elected members

Kerala Legislative Assembly
The LDF is the ruling alliance in Kerala which has 99 seats out of the 140 in the Kerala Niyamasabha.

The following list shows the MLAs belonging to LDF in the Niyamasabha.

Key

Rajya Sabha

Keys:

Lok Sabha

Kerala local body elections
The Left Democratic Front (LDF), who also forms the state government, won in more than half of all gram panchayats and block panchayats, two-thirds of district panchayats and in five out of six municipal corporations.

Political activism

On 7 December 2011, the LDF organized a 208KM human wall demanding the construction of a new dam in place of the present 115-year leaky dam at Mullapperiyar. The human wall was the second-longest of the kind in Kerala which stretched across two districts.

LDF launched its website ahead of 2011 Kerala Assembly Election.

See also
 United Front (1967–1969, Kerala)
 Left Front (West Bengal)
 Politics of Kerala
 United Democratic Front (Kerala)
 Political parties in Kerala
 List of communist parties in India

Notes

References

Further reading

External links

 Official website for election Results
 LDF Keralam

Civic nationalism
Political parties in Kerala
Political party alliances in India
1979 establishments in Kerala
Political parties established in 1979